The Man with the Golden Soles is a Syrian documentary film by the director Omar Amiralay. The film, released in 2000, is about the then Lebanese Prime minister Rafic Hariri.

References

2000s Arabic-language films
2000 films
Syrian documentary films
Films directed by Omar Amiralay
2000 documentary films
Documentary films about politicians